This is a list of episodes for the different anime adaptations of Genshiken.

Genshiken
{|class="wikitable" width="98%"
|-
! width="2%" | # !! Title !! Original airdate
|-
| colspan="4" bgcolor="#CCF"|
|-

|}

Genshiken Pt.2
{|class="wikitable" width="98%"
|-
! width="2%" | # !! Title !! Original airdate
|-
| colspan="4" bgcolor="#CCF"|
|-

|}

Genshiken: Second Generation
{|class="wikitable" width="98%"
|-
! width="2%" | # !! Title !! Original airdate
|-
| colspan="4" bgcolor="#CCF"|
|-

|}

Genshiken: Second Season OAD
{|class="wikitable" width="98%"
|-
! width="2%" | # !! Title !! Original airdate
|-
| colspan="4" bgcolor="#CCF"|
|-

|}

Anime theme songs
Opening themes   by Under17 (episode 1)
  by manzo (episodes 2-12)
  by manzo (episodes 13-15)
 "disarm dreamer" by Aki Misato (Genshiken 2 episodes 2-12)
 "Genshi, Joshi wa, Taiyo Datta" by Sumire Uesaka and Kabuki Rocks (Genshiken: Second Season episodes 1-13)

Ending themes   by Saori Atsumi  (episodes 1-15, Genshiken 2 episode 7)
  by Yūmao (Genshiken 2 episodes 1-2, 4-6, 8-12)
  by Saori Atsumi (Genshiken 2 episode 3; opening theme to Kujibiki Unbalance series 2)
  by Nozomi Yamamoto, Sumire Uesaka, Yumi Uchiyama and Ai Kakuma (Genshiken: Second Season episodes 1-13)
 "Signpost" by Nozomi Yamamoto (Genshiken: Second Season OAD)

Notes and references

Genshiken